The 2020–21 Spartan South Midlands Football League season was the 24th in the history of Spartan South Midlands Football League, a football competition in England. The league operates three divisions, two of which are in covered in this article, the Premier Division, at Step 5 and Division 1 at Step 6 of the English football league system.

The allocations for Steps 5 and 6 for season 2020–21 were announced by the FA on 21 July, and were subject to appeal.

The 2020–21 season started in September and was suspended in December a result of the COVID-19 pandemic in England. The league season was subsequently abandoned on 24 February 2021.

The scheduled restructure of non-League took place at the end of the season, with new divisions added to the Combined Counties and United Counties Leagues at Step 5 for 2021-22. Promotions from Steps 5 to 4 and 6 to 5 were based on points per game across all matches over the two cancelled seasons (2019–20 and 2020–21), while teams were promoted to Step 6 on the basis of a subjective application process.

Premier Division

The Premier Division comprises 21 teams, the same set of teams which competed in the previous season's aborted competition.

Premier Division table

Division One

Division One comprised 17 teams, two less than the number which were competing at the time the previous season's competition was aborted, the two teams leaving being:
 FC Broxbourne Borough – resigned
 Brimsdown – relocated to the Eastern Counties League
In addition, Hackney Wick were initially relocated from the Eastern Counties League, but this relocation was reversed.

Division One table

Division Two

Division Two featured 14 clubs which competed in the division last season, along with one new club:
Berkhamsted Comrades

Division Two table

References

2020-21
9
Association football events curtailed and voided due to the COVID-19 pandemic